The Instituto de la Cinematografía y de las Artes Audiovisuales (ICAA) is a Spanish government organisation (organismo autónomo), charged with  the planning of policies to support the film industry and audiovisual production. It depends on the Ministry of Culture and Sport. It is a member of the European Film Promotion (EFP) network on behalf of Spain.

History 
Through the Law 50/1984 of 30 December 1984, the ICAA was created in 1985. In 1986,  replaced Pilar Miró at the helm of the ICAA. Miguel Marías became the director general in 1988, whereas Enrique Balmaseda served as head from 1990 to 1992.

Role 
The ICAA manages the subsidies to the film industry provided by the General State Budget. It is charged with ensuring free competition in the audiovisual sector. The institute is also tasked with encouraging cooperation with similar bodies from other countries as well as with cooperating with the regional administrations of the different autonomous communities. It also assumes the function of the "safeguarding and dissemination of Spanish film heritage" by preserving copies of films, music, scripts and posters.

References 
Citations

Bibliography
 
 
 
 
 
 
 
 

Government agencies of Spain
1985 establishments in Spain
Film organisations in Spain